The duet routine competition at the 1973 World Aquatics Championships was held on 3 September 1973.

Results

References
Official Results

Duet routine